Eric Aldwinckle  (22 January 1909 – 13 January 1980) was a Canadian Official war artist, designer and one of the most prominent illustrators of the 20th century. He was also a teacher at the  Ontario College of Art, 1936–42; Principal of New School of Design and Vice-Principal of the Ontario College of Art, 1946.

Biography

Born in England in 1909 but sent to Canada in his teens, he apprenticed with printers in Toronto in the 1920s and learned the graphic design trade along the way. He struck out on his own in 1930, and built a successful design practice on corporate work and illustration, including several covers for Maclean's and illustrating for Mayfair magazine. During this period he was active in Toronto's Arts and Letters Club, where in 1938 Bertram Brooker asked him to design the cover of the new issue of its publication The Lamps, which he was editing.  Aldwinckle was also a regular part-time instructor at the Ontario College of Art.
 
In World War II he registered as a conscientious objector, and created several well-known war posters, then became a camouflage designer in Halifax, Nova Scotia. In late 1942 he heard that Ottawa was looking for volunteers for its new War Artist program. He applied and was accepted, receiving a commission in the Royal Canadian Air Force. He attained the rank of Flight Lieutenant while covering RCAF operations in Coastal Command and the 2nd Tactical Air Force. During the years 1943-6 he produced over one hundred drawings and paintings in watercolours and oils that remain the property of The Crown and reside permanently with the Canadian War Museum.

Career

He returned to his Toronto design practice in late 1945. When Frank Carmichael died suddenly he found himself in charge of the Ontario College of Art`s New School of Design. Educational administration was not for him and he resigned in 1946. In 1948, he created several covers and inside drawings for the Varsity Graduate magazine. He then worked as Graphic Arts Designer for the University of Toronto from 1948 to 1953. His celebrity as a returned war artist helped him land high-profile mural commissions with the Sunnybrook Hospital and Ontario Hydro.  In 1961 he designed the coat of arms for the newly founded York University.

In 1954, along with Frederick Varley and others, he visited the Soviet Union on the first Canadian cultural exchange of the Cold War, and their travels were documented in a Maclean's article. Although he was never a communist and undertook this visit out of curiosity, it is likely that this visit made him ideologically 'suspect' and may have adversely affected his career from this point forward.

As a mature designer, he continued to work steadily during the 1950s, counting as his clients Imperial Oil, the University of Toronto, Ryerson, York University and the Stratford Festival. He was not a prolific fine artist, however, which guaranteed him a low profile in comparison to other war artists, such as Alex Colville, Lawren P. Harris or Jack Shadbolt.

Aldwinckle was an out-of-the-box thinker decades before the term became popular. He was a student of Theosophy (his book Two Fables was published by the Theosophical Press in 1950), an accomplished chef, raconteur, astrologer, composer of music, playwright, writer, and social critic. He enjoyed mentoring young artists, and influenced the careers of the late composer Harry Somers (his correspondence with Somers is in the McMaster University Archives, RC0385), Academy Award-winning filmmaker Christopher Chapman, muralist York Wilson and designer Theo Dimson.

While his work as a war artist and as a graphic art designer were his most visible contribution, perhaps his most enduring legacy will be his role in the establishment of Killarney Provincial Park, the area where members of the Group of Seven painted some of their works.

Honours 
 Royal Canadian Academy of Arts

References

Bibliography

External links 
 

 Eric Aldwinckle fonds (R5339) at Library and Archives Canada

1909 births
1980 deaths
Artists from Toronto
Canadian illustrators
British emigrants to Canada
Canadian graphic designers
Members of the Royal Canadian Academy of Arts
Artists from Oxford
People from Old Toronto
Canadian war artists
Conscientious objectors
Academic staff of OCAD University
Royal Canadian Air Force personnel of World War II
Royal Canadian Air Force officers